Never Knew Love may refer to:
 Never Knew Love (Rick Astley song)
 Never Knew Love (Oleta Adams song)